Almogía is a town and municipality in the province of Málaga, part of the autonomous community of Andalusia in southern Spain. It is situated approximately 25 km from the city of Málaga, has a population of approximately 4,300 residents and has an economy based on the cultivation of almonds and olives. Positioned within the Montes de Málaga hills, the municipality's highest point is Santi Petri (794 m). The district's main watercourses are the River Campanillas and the Arroyos de Cauche and de los Olivos.

References

External links

Official site 

Municipalities in the Province of Málaga